The Directorate General of Captaincies and Coast Guard of Peru (DICAPI) is the maritime authority and the Peruvian Coast Guard, the same one that carries out the control and surveillance work in maritime, fluvial and lacustrine environments, as well as search and rescue tasks. It is attached to the Navy of Peru, and according to law is empowered to exercise the maritime, fluvial and lacustrine police in order to apply and enforce the national regulations and international instruments of which Peru is a party, for ensure the protection and safety of human life in the aquatic environment, the protection of the aquatic environment and its resources, as well as repress illicit activities within its jurisdiction.

History
Maritime law enforcement activities dates back to the beginning of the 17th century, such activities is usually performed by sailors. By the end of 17th century, several port captaincies were formally established due to the urgent need to maintain order in the ports. Later on, the captaincy system is organized into Captaincy Directorate. Directorate General of Captaincies and Coast Guard was established on 5 August 1919 by Supreme Decree. Current captaincies and coast guard were created by Decree Law No. 17824 of 23 September 1969, the Captaincy and Coast Guard Corps.

, Vice Admiral César Ernesto Colunge Pinto serve as Director General of DICAPI and assisted by Rear Admiral Pastor Ludwig Zanabria Acosta as Direcotr Executive of DICAPI.

Equipment
Currently the Peruvian Coast Guard is composed by two offshore patrol ships, twelve coastal patrol ships, sixteen port patrol boats, and speedboats for bay control, river patrol boats, river speedboats, lake patrol boats, lake speedboats and motorboats for river interdiction, two Sea King helicopters for SAR operations, a Twin Otter hydroplane as well as a fleet of operational vehicles which strengthens operations by coast police of Coast Guard Captaincies.

Ships

Decommissioned ships

Aircraft

Sources
 Peruvian Coast Guard Website
 Jane's Fighting Ships 2004-2005

References

External links
  Official Peruvian Coast Guard Website

Peruvian Navy
Coast guards